Badausa may refer to:
Badausa, Uttar Pradesh, city in India
 Moth genus Hypena, 1863 synonym